Caitlin Johanna Philomena Dijkstra (born 30 January 1999) is a Dutch professional footballer who plays as defender for Eredivisie club Twente and the Netherlands national team.

Club career
Dijkstra's father Meindert was a professional footballer. She grew up in Breda as a supporter of NAC, but played for RKVV JEKA as NAC had no girls' section. She progressed to CTO Eindhoven, where she combined football with studies, before she signed for reigning national champions AFC Ajax in 2018. She made her first team debut that October as a substitute in a daunting 2018–19 UEFA Women's Champions League tie with Lyon. With Ajax she won the KNVB Women's Cup in her first season with the club.

In April 2021 Dijkstra decided to leave Ajax for FC Twente upon the expiry of her contract that summer. Ajax's acquisition of Stefanie van der Gragt had reduced Dijkstra's opportunities to play in her favoured defensive role. At Twente Dijkstra signed for one year with the option of an additional year.

International career
At youth level Dijkstra played three times for the Netherlands women's national under-17 football team and 26 times for the Netherlands women's national under-19 football team. She played six times at under-20 level, including at the 2018 FIFA U-20 Women's World Cup in France. She then served as captain of the under-23 selection.

In September 2021, national team coach Mark Parsons called up Dijkstra to the senior Netherlands squad for the first time. On 29 November 2021 she played the full match in a 0–0 friendly draw with Japan in The Hague to win her first official cap. She scored her first goal on 19 February 2022 in a 3–0 victory against Finland.

Career statistics

International

Scores and results list Netherlands' goal tally first, score column indicates score after each Dijkstra goal.

References

External links

Living people
Dutch women's footballers
Eredivisie (women) players
1999 births
FC Twente (women) players
Netherlands women's international footballers
AFC Ajax (women) players
Footballers from Breda
Women's association football defenders
UEFA Women's Euro 2022 players